Water skiing competition at the 2014 Asian Beach Games was held in Phuket, Thailand from 16 to 22 November 2014 at Bangneowdam Reservoir and Anthem Wake Park, Phuket.

Medalists

Skiing

Wakeboarding

Cable

Medal table

Results

Skiing

Men's slalom
19–20 November

Men's tricks
19–20 November

Women's slalom
19–20 November

Women's tricks
19–20 November

Team overall
21–22 November

Wakeboarding

Men's wakeboard

Quarterfinals
19 November

Last chance qualifiers
20 November

Semifinals
20 November

Final
20 November

Women's wakeboard

Quarterfinals
19 November

Last chance qualifiers
20 November

Semifinals
20 November

Final
20 November

Team overall
21–22 November

Cable

Men's cable wakeboard
16 November

Semifinals

Last chance qualifier

Final

Men's cable wakeskate
16 November

Semifinals

Last chance qualifier

Final

Women's cable wakeboard
16 November

Semifinals

Last chance qualifier

Final

Women's cable wakeskate
16 November

Semifinal

Last chance qualifier

Final

Team overall
17–18 November

References

External links 
 

2014 Asian Beach Games events
2014
Asian